A hydrogen vehicle is a vehicle that uses hydrogen fuel for motive power. Hydrogen vehicles include hydrogen-fueled space rockets, as well as ships and aircraft. Power is generated by converting the chemical energy of hydrogen to mechanical energy, either by reacting hydrogen with oxygen in a fuel cell to power electric motors or, less commonly, by burning hydrogen in an internal combustion engine.

, there are two models of hydrogen cars publicly available in select markets: the Toyota Mirai (2014–), which is the world's first mass-produced dedicated fuel cell electric vehicle (FCEV), and the Hyundai Nexo (2018–). There are also fuel cell buses. Hydrogen aircraft are not expected to carry many passengers long haul before the 2030s at the earliest. 

As of 2019, 98% of hydrogen is produced by steam methane reforming, which emits carbon dioxide. It can be produced by electrolysis of water, or by thermochemical or pyrolytic means using renewable feedstocks, but the processes are currently expensive. Various technologies are being developed that aim to deliver costs low enough, and quantities great enough, to compete with hydrogen production using natural gas.

Vehicles running on hydrogen technology benefit from a long range on a single refuelling, but are subject to several drawbacks: high carbon emissions when hydrogen is produced from natural gas, capital cost burden, low energy content per unit volume at ambient conditions, production and compression of hydrogen, the investment required to build refuelling infrastructure around the world to dispense hydrogen, and transportation of hydrogen.

Vehicles

Automobiles, buses, forklifts, trains, canal boats, ships, aeroplanes, submarines, and rockets can run on hydrogen, in various forms. NASA used hydrogen to launch Space Shuttles into space. A working toy model car runs on solar power, using a regenerative fuel cell to store energy in the form of hydrogen and oxygen gas. It can then convert the fuel back into water to release the solar energy.

Aeroplanes

Companies such as Boeing, Lange Aviation, and the German Aerospace Center pursue hydrogen as fuel for crewed and uncrewed aeroplanes. In February 2008 Boeing tested a crewed flight of a small aircraft powered by a hydrogen fuel cell. Uncrewed hydrogen planes have also been tested. For large passenger aeroplanes, The Times reported that "Boeing said that hydrogen fuel cells were unlikely to power the engines of large passenger jet aeroplanes but could be used as backup or auxiliary power units onboard."

In July 2010, Boeing unveiled its hydrogen-powered Phantom Eye UAV, powered by two Ford internal-combustion engines that have been converted to run on hydrogen.

In Britain, the Reaction Engines A2 has been proposed to use the thermodynamic properties of liquid hydrogen to achieve very high speed, long distance (antipodal) flight by burning it in a precooled jet engine.

Automobiles
, there are two hydrogen cars publicly available in select markets: the Toyota Mirai and the Hyundai Nexo. The Honda Clarity was produced from 2016 to 2021.

The first road vehicle powered by a hydrogen fuel cell was the Chevrolet Electrovan, introduced by General Motors in 1966. 

The Toyota FCHV and Honda FCX, which began leasing on December 2, 2002, became the world's first government-certified commercial hydrogen fuel cell vehicles, and the Honda FCX Clarity, which began leasing in 2008, was the world's first hydrogen fuel cell vehicle designed for mass production rather than adapting an existing model. Honda established the world's first fuel cell vehicle dealer network in 2008, and at the time was the only company able to lease hydrogen fuel cell vehicles to private customers.

The 2013 Hyundai Tucson FCEV, a modified Tucson, was introduced to the market as a lease-only vehicle, and Hyundai Motors claimed it was the world's first mass-produced hydrogen fuel cell vehicle. However, due to high prices and a lack of charging infrastructure, sales fell far short of initial plans, with only 273 units sold by the end of May 2015. Hyundai Nexo, which succeeded the Tucson in 2018, was selected as the "safest SUV" by the Euro NCAP in 2018.

Toyota launched the world's first dedicated mass-produced fuel cell vehicle (FCV), the Mirai, in Japan at the end of 2014 and began sales in California, mainly the Los Angeles area and also in selected markets in Europe, the UK, Germany and Denmark later in 2015. The initial sale price in Japan was about 7 million yen ($69,000). Former European Parliament President Pat Cox estimated that Toyota would initially lose about $100,000 on each Mirai sold. At the end of 2019, Toyota had sold over 10,000 Mirais. Many automobile companies have introduced demonstration models in limited numbers (see List of fuel cell vehicles and List of hydrogen internal combustion engine vehicles).

In 2013 BMW leased hydrogen technology from Toyota, and a group formed by Ford Motor Company, Daimler AG, and Nissan announced a collaboration on hydrogen technology development. 

In 2015, Toyota announced that it would offer all 5,680 patents related to hydrogen fuel cell vehicles and hydrogen fuel cell charging station technology, which it has been researching for over 20 years, to its competitors free of charge in order to stimulate the market for hydrogen-powered vehicles.

By 2017, however, Daimler had abandoned hydrogen vehicle development, and most of the automobile companies developing hydrogen cars had switched their focus to battery electric vehicles. By 2020, all but three automobile companies had abandoned plans to manufacture hydrogen cars.

Auto racing

In 2007, the Hydrogen Electric Racing Federation was formed as a racing organization for hydrogen fuel cell-powered vehicles. The organization sponsored the Hydrogen 500, a 500-mile race.

Buses

Fuel-cell buses have been trialed by several manufacturers in different locations, for example, the Ursus Lublin. Solaris Bus & Coach introduced its Urbino 12 hydrogen electric buses in 2019. Several dozen were ordered. In 2022, the city of Montpellier, France, cancelled a contract to procure 51 buses powered by hydrogen fuel cells, when it found that "the cost of operation for hydrogen [buses] is 6 times the cost of electricity".

Trams and trains

In March 2015, China South Rail Corporation (CSR) demonstrated the world's first hydrogen fuel cell-powered tramcar at an assembly facility in Qingdao. Tracks for the new vehicle have been built in seven Chinese cities.

In northern Germany in 2018 the first fuel-cell powered Coradia iLint trains were placed into service; excess power is stored in lithium-ion batteries.

Ships

 Hydrogen fuel cells are not suitable for propulsion in large long-distance ships, but they are being considered as a range-extender for smaller, short-distance, low-speed electric vessels, such as ferries. Hydrogen in ammonia is being considered as a long-distance fuel.

Bicycles

In 2007, Pearl Hydrogen Power Source Technology Co of Shanghai, China, demonstrated a PHB hydrogen bicycle. In 2014, Australian scientists from the University of New South Wales presented their Hy-Cycle model. The same year, Canyon Bicycles started to work on the Eco Speed concept bicycle.

In 2017, Pragma Industries of France developed a bicycle that was able to travel 100 km on a single hydrogen cylinder. In 2019, Pragma announced that the product, "Alpha Bike", has been improved to offer an electrically assisted pedalling range of 150 km, and the first 200 of the bikes are to be provided to journalists covering the 45th G7 summit in Biarritz, France. If successful, 

Lloyd Alter of TreeHugger responded to the announcement, asking "why … go through the trouble of using electricity to make hydrogen, only to turn it back into electricity to charge a battery to run the e-bike [or] pick a fuel that needs an expensive filling station that can only handle 35 bikes a day, when you can charge a battery powered bike anywhere. [If] you were a captive fleet operator, why [not] just swap out batteries to get the range and the fast turnover?"

Military vehicles
General Motors' military division, GM Defense, focuses on hydrogen fuel cell vehicles. Its SURUS (Silent Utility Rover Universal Superstructure) is a flexible fuel cell electric platform with autonomous capabilities. Since April 2017, the U.S. Army has been testing the commercial Chevrolet Colorado ZH2 on its U.S. bases to determine the viability of hydrogen-powered vehicles in military mission tactical environments.

Motorcycles and scooters
ENV develops electric motorcycles powered by a hydrogen fuel cell, including the Crosscage and Biplane. Other manufacturers as Vectrix are working on hydrogen scooters. Finally, hydrogen-fuel-cell-electric-hybrid scooters are being made such as the Suzuki Burgman fuel-cell scooter and the FHybrid. The Burgman received "whole vehicle type" approval in the EU. The Taiwanese company APFCT conducted a live street test with 80 fuel-cell scooters for Taiwan's Bureau of Energy.

Auto rickshaws
Hydrogen auto rickshaw concept vehicles have been built by Mahindra HyAlfa and Bajaj Auto.

Quads and tractors
Autostudi S.r.l's H-Due is a hydrogen-powered quad, capable of transporting 1-3 passengers. A concept for a hydrogen-powered tractor has been proposed.

Fork trucks
A hydrogen internal combustion engine (or "HICE") forklift or HICE lift truck is a hydrogen fueled, internal combustion engine-powered industrial forklift truck used for lifting and transporting materials. The first production HICE forklift truck based on the Linde X39 Diesel was presented at an exposition in Hannover on May 27, 2008. It used a 2.0 litre,  diesel internal combustion engine converted to use hydrogen as a fuel with the use of a compressor and direct injection.

In 2013 there were over 4,000 fuel cell forklifts used in material handling in the US. The global market was estimated at 1 million fuel cell powered forklifts per year for 2014–2016. Fleets are being operated by companies around the world. Pike Research stated in 2011 that fuel-cell-powered forklifts will be the largest driver of hydrogen fuel demand by 2020.

Most companies in Europe and the US do not use petroleum powered forklifts, as these vehicles work indoors where emissions must be controlled and instead use electric forklifts. Fuel-cell-powered forklifts can provide benefits over battery powered forklifts as they can be refueled in 3 minutes. They can be used in refrigerated warehouses, as their performance is not degraded by lower temperatures. The fuel cell units are often designed as drop-in replacements.

Rockets

Many large rockets use liquid hydrogen as fuel, with liquid oxygen as an oxidizer (LH2/LOX). An advantage of hydrogen rocket fuel is the high effective exhaust velocity compared to kerosene/LOX or UDMH/NTO engines. According to the Tsiolkovsky rocket equation, a rocket with higher exhaust velocity uses less propellant to accelerate. Also the energy density of hydrogen is greater than any other fuel. LH2/LOX also yields the greatest efficiency in relation to the amount of propellant consumed, of any known rocket propellant.

A disadvantage of LH2/LOX engines is the low density and low temperature of liquid hydrogen, which means bigger and insulated and thus heavier fuel tanks are needed. This increases the rocket's structural mass which reduces its delta-v significantly. Another disadvantage is the poor storability of LH2/LOX-powered rockets: Due to the constant hydrogen boil-off, the rocket must be fueled shortly before launch, which makes cryogenic engines unsuitable for ICBMs and other rocket applications with the need for short launch preparations.

Overall, the delta-v of a hydrogen stage is typically not much different from that of a dense fuelled stage, but the weight of a hydrogen stage is much less, which makes it particularly effective for upper stages, since they are carried by the lower stages. For first stages, dense fuelled rockets in studies may show a small advantage, due to the smaller vehicle size and lower air drag.

LH2/LOX were also used in the Space Shuttle to run the fuel cells that power the electrical systems. The byproduct of the fuel cell is water, which is used for drinking and other applications that require water in space.

Heavy trucks 
United Parcel Service began testing of a hydrogen powered delivery vehicle in 2017. In 2020, Hyundai began commercial production of its Xcient fuel cell trucks and shipped ten of them to Switzerland. 

In 2022 in Australia, five hydrogen fuel cell class 8 trucks were placed into use to transport zinc from Sun Metals' Townsville mine to the Port of Townsville, Queensland, to be shipped around the world.

Internal combustion vehicle

Hydrogen internal combustion engine cars are different from hydrogen fuel cell cars. The hydrogen internal combustion car is a slightly modified version of the traditional gasoline internal combustion engine car. These hydrogen engines burn fuel in the same manner that gasoline engines do; the main difference is the exhaust product. Gasoline combustion results in emissions of mostly carbon dioxide and water, plus trace amounts of carbon monoxide, particulates and unburned hydrocarbons, while the main exhaust product of hydrogen combustion is water vapor.

In 1807 François Isaac de Rivaz designed the first hydrogen-fueled internal combustion engine. In 1965, Roger E. Billings, then a high school student, converted a Model A to run on hydrogen. In 1970 Paul Dieges patented a modification to internal combustion engines which allowed a gasoline-powered engine to run on hydrogen.

Mazda has developed Wankel engines burning hydrogen, which are used in the Mazda RX-8 Hydrogen RE. The advantage of using an internal combustion engine, like Wankel and piston engines, is the lower cost of retooling for production.

Fuel cell

Fuel cell cost
Hydrogen fuel cells are relatively expensive to produce, as their designs require rare substances, such as platinum, as a catalyst, In 2014, former European Parliament President Pat Cox estimated that Toyota would initially lose about $100,000 on each Mirai sold. In 2020, researchers at the University of Copenhagen's Department of Chemistry are developing a new type of catalyst that they hope will decrease the cost of fuel cells. This new catalyst uses far less platinum because the platinum nano-particles are not coated over carbon which, in conventional hydrogen fuel cells, keeps the nano-particles in place but also causes the catalyst to become unstable and denatures it slowly, requiring even more platinum. The new technology uses durable nanowires instead of the nano-particles. "The next step for the researchers is to scale up their results so that the technology can be implemented in hydrogen vehicles."

Freezing conditions
The problems in early fuel-cell designs at low temperatures concerning range and cold start capabilities have been addressed so that they "cannot be seen as show-stoppers anymore". Users in 2014 said that their fuel cell vehicles perform flawlessly in temperatures below zero, even with the heaters blasting, without significantly reducing range. Studies using neutron radiography on unassisted cold-start indicate ice formation in the cathode, three stages in cold start and Nafion ionic conductivity. A parameter, defined as coulomb of charge, was also defined to measure cold start capability.

Service life
The service life of fuel cells is comparable to that of other vehicles. Polymer-electrolyte membrane (PEM) fuel cell service life is 7,300 hours under cycling conditions.

Hydrogen
Hydrogen does not exist in convenient reservoirs or deposits like fossil fuels or helium. It is produced from feedstocks such as natural gas and biomass or electrolyzed from water. A suggested benefit of large-scale deployment of hydrogen vehicles is that it could lead to decreased emissions of greenhouse gases and ozone precursors. However, as of 2014, 95% of hydrogen is made from methane. It can be produced by thermochemical or pyrolitic means using renewable feedstocks, but that is an expensive process. 

Renewable electricity can however be used to power the conversion of water into hydrogen: Integrated wind-to-hydrogen (power to gas) plants, using electrolysis of water, are exploring technologies to deliver costs low enough, and quantities great enough, to compete with traditional energy sources. The challenges facing the use of hydrogen in vehicles include its storage on board the vehicle.

Production

The molecular hydrogen needed as an onboard fuel for hydrogen vehicles can be obtained through many thermochemical methods utilizing natural gas, coal (by a process known as coal gasification), liquefied petroleum gas, biomass (biomass gasification), by a process called thermolysis, or as a microbial waste product called biohydrogen or Biological hydrogen production. 95% of hydrogen is produced using natural gas. 85% of hydrogen produced is used to remove sulfur from gasoline. Hydrogen can be produced from water by electrolysis at working efficiencies of 65–70%. Hydrogen can be made by chemical reduction using chemical hydrides or aluminum. Current technologies for manufacturing hydrogen use energy in various forms, totaling between 25 and 50 percent of the higher heating value of the hydrogen fuel, used to produce, compress or liquefy, and transmit the hydrogen by pipeline or truck.

Environmental consequences of the production of hydrogen from fossil energy resources include the emission of greenhouse gasses, a consequence that would also result from the on-board reforming of methanol into hydrogen. Hydrogen production using renewable energy resources would not create such emissions, but the scale of renewable energy production would need to be expanded to be used in producing hydrogen for a significant part of transportation needs. In a few countries, renewable sources are being used more widely to produce energy and hydrogen. For example, Iceland is using geothermal power to produce hydrogen, and Denmark is using wind.

Storage

Compressed hydrogen in hydrogen tanks at 350 bar (5,000 psi) and 700 bar (10,000 psi) is used for hydrogen tank systems in vehicles, based on type IV carbon-composite technology.

Hydrogen has a very low volumetric energy density at ambient conditions, compared with gasoline and other vehicle fuels. It must be stored in a vehicle either as a super-cooled liquid or as highly compressed gas, which require additional energy to accomplish. In 2018, researchers at CSIRO in Australia powered a Toyota Mirai and Hyundai Nexo with hydrogen separated from ammonia using a membrane technology. Ammonia is easier to transport safely in tankers than pure hydrogen.

Infrastructure

The hydrogen infrastructure consists of hydrogen-equipped filling stations, which are supplied with hydrogen via compressed hydrogen tube trailers, liquid hydrogen tank trucks or dedicated onsite production, and some industrial hydrogen pipeline transport. The distribution of hydrogen fuel for vehicles throughout the U.S. would require new hydrogen stations that would cost between 20 billion dollars in the US, (4.6 billion in the EU). and half trillion dollars in the US.

, there were 49 publicly accessible hydrogen refueling stations in the US, 48 of which were located in California (compared with 42,830 electric charging stations). By 2017, there were 91 hydrogen fueling stations in Japan.

Codes and standards
Hydrogen codes and standards, as well as codes and technical standards for hydrogen safety and the storage of hydrogen, have been an institutional barrier to deploying hydrogen technologies. To enable the commercialization of hydrogen in consumer products, new codes and standards must be developed and adopted by federal, state and local governments.

Official support

U.S. initiatives
Fuel cell buses are supported.

The New York State Energy Research and Development Authority (NYSERDA) has created incentives for hydrogen fuel cell electric trucks and buses.

Other efforts
In Japan, hydrogen is mainly to be sourced from outside Japan.

Norway plans a series of hydrogen refueling stations along the main roads.

Criticism
Critics claim the time frame for overcoming the technical and economic challenges to implementing wide-scale use of hydrogen in cars is likely to be at least several decades. They argue that the focus on the use of the hydrogen car is a dangerous detour from more readily available solutions to reducing the use of fossil fuels in vehicles. In 2008, Wired News reported that "experts say it will be 40 years or more before hydrogen has any meaningful impact on gasoline consumption or global warming, and we can't afford to wait that long. In the meantime, fuel cells are diverting resources from more immediate solutions."

In the 2006 documentary, Who Killed the Electric Car?, former U.S. Department of Energy official Joseph Romm said: "A hydrogen car is one of the least efficient, most expensive ways to reduce greenhouse gases." He held the same views in 2014. In 2009, the Los Angeles Times wrote that "hydrogen is a lousy way to move cars." Robert Zubrin, the author of Energy Victory, stated: "Hydrogen is 'just about the worst possible vehicle fuel'". The Economist noted that most hydrogen is produced through steam methane reformation, which creates at least as much emission of carbon per mile as some of today's gasoline cars, but that if the hydrogen could be produced using renewable energy, "it would surely be easier simply to use this energy to charge the batteries of all-electric or plug-in hybrid vehicles." Over their lifetimes, hydrogen vehicles will emit more carbon than gasoline vehicles. The Washington Post asked in 2009, "[W]hy would you want to store energy in the form of hydrogen and then use that hydrogen to produce electricity for a motor, when electrical energy is already waiting to be sucked out of sockets all over America and stored in auto batteries"?

Volkswagen's Rudolf Krebs said in 2013 that "no matter how excellent you make the cars themselves, the laws of physics hinder their overall efficiency. The most efficient way to convert energy to mobility is electricity." He elaborated: "Hydrogen mobility only makes sense if you use green energy", but ... you need to convert it first into hydrogen "with low efficiencies" where "you lose about 40 percent of the initial energy". You then must compress the hydrogen and store it under high pressure in tanks, which uses more energy. "And then you have to convert the hydrogen back to electricity in a fuel cell with another efficiency loss". Krebs continued: "in the end, from your original 100 percent of electric energy, you end up with 30 to 40 percent." In 2015, CleanTechnica listed some of the disadvantages of hydrogen fuel cell vehicles A 2016 study in Energy by scientists at Stanford University and the Technical University of Munich concluded that, even assuming local hydrogen production, "investing in all-electric battery vehicles is a more economical choice for reducing carbon dioxide emissions". 

A 2017 analysis published in Green Car Reports concluded that the best hydrogen-fuel-cell vehicles consume "more than three times more electricity per mile than an electric vehicle ... generate more greenhouse gas emissions than other powertrain technologies ... [and have] very high fuel costs. ... Considering all the obstacles and requirements for new infrastructure (estimated to cost as much as $400 billion), fuel-cell vehicles seem likely to be a niche technology at best, with little impact on U.S. oil consumption. The US Department of Energy agrees, for fuel produced by grid electricity via electrolysis, but not for most other pathways for generation. A 2019 video by Real Engineering noted that, notwithstanding the introduction of vehicles that run on hydrogen, using hydrogen as a fuel for cars does not help to reduce carbon emissions from transportation. The 95% of hydrogen still produced from fossil fuels releases carbon dioxide, and producing hydrogen from water is an energy-consuming process. Storing hydrogen requires more energy either to cool it down to the liquid state or to put it into tanks under high pressure, and delivering the hydrogen to fueling stations requires more energy and may release more carbon. The hydrogen needed to move a FCV a kilometer costs approximately 8 times as much as the electricity needed to move a BEV the same distance. Also in 2019, Katsushi Inoue, the president of Honda Europe, stated, "Our focus is on hybrid and electric vehicles now. Maybe hydrogen fuel cell cars will come, but that’s a technology for the next era."

Assessments since 2020 have concluded that hydrogen vehicles are still only 38% efficient, while battery EVs are from 80% to 95% efficient. A 2021 assessment by CleanTechnica concluded that while hydrogen cars are far less efficient than electric cars, the vast majority of hydrogen being produced is polluting grey hydrogen, and delivering hydrogen would require building a vast and expensive new infrastructure, the remaining two "advantages of fuel cell vehicles – longer range and fast fueling times – are rapidly being eroded by improving battery and charging technology." A 2022 study in Nature Electronics agreed. Another 2022 article, in Recharge News, stated that ships are more likely to be powered by ammonia or methanol than hydrogen.

Safety and supply

Hydrogen fuel is hazardous because of the low ignition energy (see also Autoignition temperature) and high combustion energy of hydrogen, and because it tends to leak easily from tanks. Explosions at hydrogen filling stations have been reported. Hydrogen fuelling stations generally receive deliveries of hydrogen by truck from hydrogen suppliers. An interruption at a hydrogen supply facility can shut down multiple hydrogen fuelling stations.

Comparison with other types of alternative fuel vehicle

Hydrogen vehicles compete with various proposed alternatives to the modern fossil fuel powered vehicle infrastructure.

Plug-in hybrids

Plug-in hybrid electric vehicles, or PHEVs, are hybrid vehicles that can be plugged into the electric grid and contain an electric motor and also an internal combustion engine. The PHEV concept augments standard hybrid electric vehicles with the ability to recharge their batteries from an external source, enabling increased use of the vehicle's electric motors while reducing their reliance on internal combustion engines.

Natural gas

Internal combustion engine-based compressed natural gas(CNG), HCNG, LPG or LNG vehicles (Natural gas vehicles or NGVs) use methane (Natural gas or Biogas) directly as a fuel source. Natural gas has a higher energy density than hydrogen gas. NGVs using biogas are nearly carbon neutral. Unlike hydrogen vehicles, CNG vehicles have been available for many years, and there is sufficient infrastructure to provide both commercial and home refueling stations. Worldwide, there were 14.8 million natural gas vehicles by the end of 2011. The other use for natural gas is in steam reforming which is the common way to produce hydrogen gas for use in electric cars with fuel cells.

Methane is also an alternative rocket fuel.

All-electric vehicles

 electric ships cannot carry many containers across oceans and electric aircraft cannot carry many passengers long haul.

Long distance electric trucks may require more megawatt charging infrastructure.

See also

Airship
Alternative fuel car
Bivalent engine
Fuel gas-powered scooter
Carbon-neutral fuel
Formic acid vehicle
Hell and High Water
Hydrogen transport
Proton exchange membrane fuel cell 
Hydrogen economy
The Hype about Hydrogen
Tribrid vehicle
World Green Car

References

External links

California Fuel Cell Partnership homepage
Fuel Cell Today - Market-based intelligence on the fuel cell industry
U.S. Dept. of Energy hydrogen pages
Sandia Corporation – Hydrogen internal combustion engine description
Inside world's first hydrogen-powered production car BBC News, 14 September 2010
Toyota Ecopark Hydrogen Demonstration ARENAWIRE, 22 March 2019

 
Automotive technologies
Hydrogen technologies
Hydrogen economy
Emerging technologies